Christopher Miles Boardman,  (born 26 August 1968) is a British former racing cyclist. A time trial and prologue specialist, Boardman won the inaugural men's World time trial championship in 1994, won the individual pursuit gold medal at the 1992 Summer Olympics, broke the world hour record three times, and won three prologue stages (and consequently wore the yellow jersey on three occasions) at the Tour de France.

Boardman's nickname is "The Professor", for his meticulous attention to detail in preparation and training, and his technical know-how. He had an altitude tent built in his house to help him prepare for the hour record attempt, although in an interview he claimed that all it did was help him focus. Boardman focused on interval training. He was a keen user of power measuring devices. For his winning ways in time trials and prologues of stage races, he was also nicknamed "Mr. Prologue".

Boardman is also notable for having used the Lotus 108 time trial bicycle designed by Mike Burrows and built by the sports car manufacturer Lotus. Later he worked with the UK carbon fibre bike specialist Hotta, to produce other time-trial frame designs, which he raced in various events including world championships, and Olympic games. He is now involved in producing commercial and competition bikes with the Boardman Bikes and Boardman Elite ventures.

In 1992, he was awarded an MBE for services to cycling.

Early life and amateur career
He was educated at Hilbre High School in Wirral, Merseyside, and rode in his first bike race at the age of 13. He was on the national cycling team by the age of 16.

Boardman won his first national RTTC time trial title in the 1984 "GHS" schoolboy 10-mile championship and subsequently won the 1986 junior 25-mile championship. He also broke the junior 25-mile national record in 1984.

As a senior he won four consecutive hill climb championships (from 1988 to 1991), five consecutive 25-mile championships (from 1989 to 1993), the 50-mile championship in 1991 and 1992, and the men's British time trial championship in 2000. He broke the record for 25 miles in 1992 and 1993 with 45 minutes 57 seconds (which he held until 2009) on a course based on the A34 near Oxford. He was also a member of the winning North Wirral Velo team in the 1993 100 km team time trial championship (in a record time of 2:00:07), having previously won the event three times with Manchester Wheelers' Club, in 1988, 1989 and 1991.

At the 1992 Summer Olympics in Barcelona, Boardman rode a Lotus 108 in the 4 km individual pursuit. Lotus Engineering's 'uni-axle' design incorporated several new features. Boardman caught Germany's Jens Lehmann, the 1991 World Champion, in the Olympic final on his way to winning the gold medal.

Professional career
Having started his cycling career as a time trial specialist, he turned professional with the GAN team, later renamed the Crédit Agricole team, of manager Roger Legeay. His first race as a professional was the 1993 Grand Prix Eddy Merckx, a 66 km time trial which he won. He further won several stages of the Midi Libre and Critérium du Dauphiné Libéré stage races, including the final road stage. In 1993 Boardman established the fastest time for a bicycle around the 37.73 mile Snaefell Mountain Course, the course used for the Isle of Man TT Races. Riding a specially modified bicycle, Boardman recorded a time of 1hr 23min 54secs. The time recorded would prove to be the longest standing cycling record on the Isle of Man, until it was beaten by Peter Kennaugh in 2015. Kennaugh, riding a standard racing bicycle, beat the record by six seconds.

Boardman competed with Graeme Obree for the hour record using radically modified time-trial bikes, beating each other's records in turn; in one eight-month period in 1994 the record fell four times. Boardman won fame by winning the prologue of the 1994 Tour de France with what was then the fastest time ever recorded. In the process he caught Luc Leblanc, who had previously been dismissive about Boardman's 1993 hour record, claiming that it could probably be beaten by half the professional peloton. However he subsequently lost the yellow jersey in a team time trial. He was hailed as the UK's future Tour de France winner, despite his own insistence that it was a long shot. After retirement he said he was not able to recover from the rigours of stage racing due to a low hormone profile. "I've always had it, it's probably been that way since I was born, but because of the type of racing that I did in the past, it was not a problem."

In the 1995 Tour de France, Boardman crashed in the prologue and was forced to quit by his injuries. The 1996 Tour de France saw him make a timid return in the wet and rainy prologue where he was beaten by Alex Zülle and finished in second place. Boardman won bronze in the 52 km road time trial at the 1996 Summer Olympics in Atlanta. He did not defend his track individual pursuit title.

Boardman made a comeback at the 1997 Tour de France, winning the prologue of the Tour once more, although a crash forced him to quit the tour on stage 13.

In 1998 Tour de France, when the Tour began in Dublin, Ireland, Boardman won the prologue, but this time crashed out of the race on stage 2. In 1998 he was diagnosed with osteopenia due to low testosterone levels. Treatment to prevent a worsening of his condition would have required him to take testosterone, which is banned under anti-doping rules. The UCI refused to allow Boardman an exemption on medical grounds. Faced with either retiring to allow treatment for his osteoporosis, or continuing to cycle without taking testosterone, Boardman chose to continue in cycling untreated for a further two years, hoping to finish his career on a high note at the 2000 Summer Olympics.

In 1997 the UCI had changed their regulations for the Hour Record, restricting competitors to roughly the same equipment as Eddy Merckx had used in the 1970s, banning time trial helmets, disc or tri-spoke wheels, aerodynamic bars and monocoque composite frames. Boardman made an attempt at the Hour Record using this new ruling in 2000 and succeeded in riding 49.441 km, just 13 m further than Merckx's 28-year-old record.

Boardman's preparation for the road time trial at the 2000 Olympics was affected by missing the 2000 Tour de France due to sinus problems; he finished eleventh in the time trial.

Boardman retired after the Olympics, at the age of 32. In an interview Boardman admitted that the last two years of his professional career were the most difficult, especially because of his debilitating health condition and also marital issues. Boardman's osteoporosis was uncommon for someone as young as he was. He was criticised for not realising his potential, but in response he said that, "I never considered myself particularly gifted, but I managed to stretch and mould the ability that I have, and found a niche for myself."

Cycling and Walking Commissioner
Boardman was appointed Greater Manchester’s first Cycling and Walking Commissioner by Andy Burnham in 2017. The Bee Network plan which he has developed is intended to be the UK’s ‘first’ joined-up cycling and walking network. It is intended to deliver 1,800 miles of protected walking and cycling routes. 

In May 2021, Boardman was promoted to become Greater Manchester’s first Transport Commissioner, he will be tasked with accelerating the development of The Bee Network cycling and walking network and to integrate those modes with Metrolink, buses and trains.

Boardman was appointed as Interim Commissioner for the government’s new cycling and walking body, Active Travel England, in January 2022, and permanently as Commissioner from June 2022, leaving his role at Greater Manchester.

Personal life
Boardman lives with his wife and six children in his native Wirral. Since retirement from professional cycling he has presented for ITV's cycling coverage and currently has a brand of cycles and accessories under the name Boardman Bikes. He is also involved in producing competition cycles through Boardman Elite.

Boardman was appointed a technical adviser to the British road and track cycling team in 2004, and was equipment and technical manager to the TeamGB cyclists at the 2008 Beijing Olympic Games.

In 2009 Boardman took part in the London marathon, finishing in 3hrs 19min 27sec. He was also inducted into the British Cycling Hall of Fame.

In 2012 Boardman commentated alongside Hugh Porter for the BBC on the cycling at the 2012 Summer Olympics, and is a contributor to cycling programmes on both BBC and ITV.

Boardman appeared on the BBC Top Gear TV show in Series 21, Episode 5 (2 March 2014) in his role as a British Cycling policy advisor in the "Make a commercial for reducing cycle-related accidents" feature.

He is an advocate of policies to greatly increase utility cycling in the United Kingdom, citing the potential to reduce the 35,000 annual deaths from obesity-related diseases, and urging that in road traffic accidents there be a presumption of guilt on the driver of the larger vehicle. In July 2016, his mother Carol was killed by a motor vehicle while cycling; the driver was jailed for causing death by dangerous driving.

Boardman has recounted an incident that he said changed the path of his working life: in about 2010 his young daughter asked to ride to the park with him, in the typical northern seaside town where they lived; Boardman refused, thinking it too dangerous. He said it felt very wrong that he, an ex-Olympic cyclist, did not feel he could keep his child safe on a one-minute 550m ride, so he decided to do something about it. In July 2017 Boardman was appointed Greater Manchester's first commissioner for walking and cycling. On 29 July 2018, at the end of that year's Tour de France coverage on ITV4, Boardman announced he was leaving his role as co-presenter in order to concentrate on that role.

Boardman was featured on BBC Question Time on 14 November 2019.

Boardman returned as a presenter on ITV4's coverage of the 2020 edition of the Tour de France which began on 29 August 2020 in Nice.

Career achievements

Major results
Source:

Road

1988
 1st  National Hill Climb Championships
1989
 1st  National Hill Climb Championships
1990
 1st  National Hill Climb Championships
 1st Prologue Olympia's Tour
 3rd  Team time trial, Commonwealth Games
1991
 1st  National Hill Climb Championships
1993
 1st Chrono des Nations
 1st Duo Normand (with Laurent Bezault)
 1st Grand Prix Eddy Merckx
 2nd Firenze–Pistoia
 4th Grand Prix des Nations
1994
 1st  Time trial, UCI Road World Championships
 Tour de France
1st Prologue
Held  after Prologue–Stage 2
Held  after Prologue
 Critérium du Dauphiné Libéré
1st Prologue & Stages 3 (ITT) & 7
 Vuelta a Murcia
1st Prologue & Stage 5 (ITT)
 1st Stage 6 (ITT) Tour de Suisse
 2nd Circuit de l'Aulne
 3rd GP Karlsruhe (with Pascal Lance)
 4th Overall Tour de l'Oise
 6th Grand Prix des Nations
 10th Grand Prix Eddy Merckx
1995
 1st Stage 4 (ITT) Four Days of Dunkirk
 2nd Overall Critérium du Dauphiné Libéré
1st Prologue
 2nd Overall Tour de Picardie
1st Stage 3b (ITT) 
 6th Trophée des Grimpeurs
 10th Overall Grand Prix du Midi Libre
1st Stage 6 (ITT) 
1996
 1st  Overall Critérium International
 1st Chrono des Herbiers
 1st Grand Prix Eddy Merckx
 1st Grand Prix des Nations
 1st Duo Normand (with Paul Manning)
 1st LuK Challenge Chrono (with Uwe Peschel)
 1st Stage 3 (ITT) Four Days of Dunkirk
 1st Stage 2a Route du Sud
 2nd  Time trial, UCI Road World Championships
 3rd  Time trial, Olympic Games
 3rd Overall Paris–Nice
1st Stage 8b (ITT) 
 3rd Overall Tour de l'Oise
 4th Overall Grand Prix du Midi Libre
 5th Overall Critérium du Dauphiné Libéré
1st Prologue
 7th Overall Tour Méditerranéen
1997
 Tour de France
1st Prologue
Held  after Prologue–Stage 2
Held  after Prologue
 Volta a Catalunya
1st Stages 1b (ITT) & 5 (ITT) 
 1st Prologue Critérium du Dauphiné Libéré
 1st Stage 5b (ITT) Vuelta a la Comunitat Valenciana
 2nd Overall Tour de Romandie
1st Prologue & Stage 6 (ITT)
 2nd Grand Prix Eddy Merckx
 3rd  Time trial, UCI Road World Championships
 3rd Grand Prix des Nations
 5th Overall Tour of the Basque Country
 10th Overall À travers Lausanne
1998
 Tour de France
1st Prologue
Held  after Prologue–Stage 1
Held  after Prologue
 Volta a Catalunya
1st Prologue & Stage 5 (ITT)
 Critérium du Dauphiné Libéré
1st Prologue & Stage 4 (ITT)
 1st Stage 5b Tour de l'Ain
 2nd Overall Prutour
1st Prologue & Stage 1
 4th Grand Prix Eddy Merckx
 8th Chrono des Herbiers
1999
 1st GP Karlsruhe (with Jens Voigt)
 1st Duo Normand (with Jens Voigt)
 1st LuK Challenge Chrono (with Jens Voigt)
 1st Prologue Paris–Nice
 1st Stage 3 (ITT) Critérium International
 1st Stage 2b (ITT) Prutour
 2nd Grand Prix des Nations
 3rd  Time trial, UCI Road World Championships
 3rd Grand Prix Eddy Merckx (with Jens Voigt)
 6th Chrono des Herbiers
 8th Overall Circuit de la Sarthe
2000
 2nd Grand Prix Eddy Merckx (with Jens Voigt)
 4th Time trial, UCI Road World Championships
 8th Overall Circuit de la Sarthe
 8th Grand Prix des Nations

Grand Tour general classification results timeline

Track

1986
 3rd  Team pursuit, Commonwealth Games
1989
 1st  Individual pursuit, National Amateur Track Championships
1990
 3rd  Team pursuit, Commonwealth Games
1991
 1st  Individual pursuit, National Amateur Track Championships
1992
 1st  Individual pursuit, Olympic Games
1st  Individual pursuit, National Amateur Track Championships
1993
 3rd  Individual pursuit, UCI Track World Championships
1994
 1st  Individual pursuit, UCI Track World Championships
1996
 1st  Individual pursuit, UCI Track World Championships

World records

Awards and honours

 Bidlake Memorial Prize: 1992
 Sports Journalists' Association Pat Besford Award: 1992
 Member of the Order of the British Empire: 1993
 British Cycling Hall of Fame: 2010

See also

 List of British cyclists
 List of British cyclists who have led the Tour de France general classification
 List of Olympic medalists in cycling (men)
 World record progression track cycling – Men's individual pursuit
 Yellow jersey statistics

References

Sources

Further reading

External links

 Official website
 
 Chris Boardman compares cycling in Holland and Britain - video on YouTube, published 17 July 2015, by itv4realfans.

 
 
 

1968 births
Living people
British male cyclists
English male cyclists
English Olympic medallists
British Tour de France stage winners
Tour de France prologue winners
Cyclists at the 1988 Summer Olympics
Cyclists at the 1992 Summer Olympics
Cyclists at the 1996 Summer Olympics
Cyclists at the 2000 Summer Olympics
Olympic cyclists of Great Britain
UCI Road World Champions (elite men)
Olympic gold medallists for Great Britain
Olympic bronze medallists for Great Britain
Cycling announcers
People from Hoylake
Olympic medalists in cycling
Members of the Order of the British Empire
British cycle designers
Tour de Suisse stage winners
UCI Track Cycling World Champions (men)
Medalists at the 1996 Summer Olympics
Medalists at the 1992 Summer Olympics
Commonwealth Games bronze medallists for England
Cyclists at the 1986 Commonwealth Games
Cyclists at the 1990 Commonwealth Games
Commonwealth Games medallists in cycling
Cycling advocates
English track cyclists
Medallists at the 1986 Commonwealth Games
Medallists at the 1990 Commonwealth Games